Same was a Greek city in ancient Cephalonia.

References

See also
List of cities in ancient Epirus

Populated places in ancient Cephalonia
Cities in ancient Epirus
Former populated places in Greece
Ancient Greek archaeological sites in Greece